Donald Trump presidential campaign endorsements may refer to:

List of Donald Trump 2016 presidential campaign endorsements
List of Donald Trump 2020 presidential campaign endorsements